The 20th Empire Awards ceremony (officially known as the Jameson Empire Awards), presented by the British film magazine Empire, honored the best films of 2014 and took place on 29 March 2015 at the Grosvenor House Hotel in London, England. During the ceremony, Empire presented Empire Awards in 12 categories as well as three honorary awards. Irish actor James Nesbitt hosted the show for the second consecutive year. The awards were sponsored by Jameson Irish Whiskey for the seventh consecutive year.

Interstellar won two awards including Best Film and Best Director for Christopher Nolan. Other winners included Kingsman: The Secret Service also with two awards and Dawn of the Planet of the Apes, Gone Girl, Guardians of the Galaxy, Oculus, Paddington, The Babadook, The Imitation Game and X-Men: Days of Future Past with one. The cast of Game of Thrones received the Empire Hero Award, Christopher Nolan received the Empire Inspiration Award and Ralph Fiennes received the Empire Legend Award. Oliver Jones & Robert Kenyon from the United Kingdom won the Done In 60 Seconds Award for their 60-second film version of Ghostbusters.

Winners and nominees
Winners are listed first and highlighted in boldface.

Multiple awards
The following two films received multiple awards:

Multiple nominations
The following 14 films received multiple nominations:

Done In 60 Seconds films

References

External links
 
 

Empire Award ceremonies
2014 film awards
2015 in London
2015 in British cinema
March 2015 events in the United Kingdom
2010s in the City of Westminster